Happiness Is Being with the Spinners is the seventh studio album recorded by American R&B group The Spinners, released in July 1976 on the Atlantic label. It was produced by Thom Bell and recorded at Sigma Sound Studios in Philadelphia and Kaye-Smith Studios in Seattle.

History
The album reached the top ten of the R&B albums chart, their last to do so, peaking at number five. It also reached #25 on the Billboard 200. The single edit version of the seven-minute "The Rubberband Man" became the group's sixth and final R&B chart-topper and peaked at number two on the Billboard Hot 100. It also reached #16 on the UK Singles Chart. Another single, "Wake Up Susan", had moderate success on the charts.

Track listing

Personnel
Henry Fambrough, Billy Henderson, Pervis Jackson, Bobby Smith, Philippé Soul Wynne – vocals
Carla Benson, Evette Benton, Barbara Ingram – backing vocals
Tony Bell, Bobby Eli – guitars
Thom Bell – keyboards, producer, arranger, conductor 
Bob Babbitt – bass guitar
Andrew Smith – drums
Larry Washington – percussion
MFSB – orchestra

Charts

Singles

References

External links
 

1976 albums
The Spinners (American group) albums
Albums produced by Thom Bell
Albums arranged by Thom Bell
Albums recorded at Sigma Sound Studios
Atlantic Records albums